C. Percival Dietsch (23 May 1881 - 22 Feb 1961), full name Clarence Percival Dietsch, was an American born in New York City and raised in The Bronx, NY, as the youngest child of Morris Dietsch and New York-born Clara M. Dietsch (maiden name Henry). Morris and his twin brother Leonard were born in America to Frederick and Margaret Dietsch (maiden name unknown) after they emigrated with other children of theirs from Germany in 1836.

Dietsch was awarded the Rinehart Prize in Sculpture in 1905 from the Peabody Institute and received a scholarship to attend the American Academy in Rome. Correspondence from Dietsch is included in the papers of William Henry Rinehart. He was named a Fellow of the American Academy of Rome in 1909.

He lived in Rome from Nov. 1906–1910. He then lived in Paris for a short time and won the Prix de Rome. Continuing to travel, he sailed back to New York from Naples upon the RMS Saxonia (1899) on Oct. 6, 1912. He had a passport obtained from Berne, Switzerland on Aug. 1, 1914. He was awarded honorable mention for exhibitions at the Panama–Pacific International Exposition in San Francisco in 1915.

He registered for the draft for World War I in New York on September 12, 1918, with the registrar describing him as tall in height and slender of build, with brown eyes and dark brown hair. Shortly thereafter on Oct. 24, 1918, he embarked upon the SS Espagne (Provence, 1909) en route to France to assist Winifred Holt as an instructor for soldiers blinded in battle, with the passport clerk describing him as 6 feet tall with a small scar on the palm of his left hand.

In addition to New York City, Dietsch lived in Connecticut for a time (as his father had a home in Saybrook) and as of 1935 was living in Palm Beach, Florida, where he died in 1961.

Dietsch studied at the New York School of Art under William Merritt Chase and was also a student of Attilio Piccirilli. He was a member of the Architectural League of New York as well as such Palm Beach institutions as the Society of Four Arts and the Everglades Club.

Since 1968, The National Sculpture Society, of which he was also a member, has awarded the C. Percival Dietsch Prize for sculpture in the round in his honor at its annual exhibition. A piece by Dietsch entitled "Nude Female" was sold at Sotheby's on March 11, 2004.

C. Percival Dietsch Prize for Sculpture in the Round

Beginning in 1968, the National Sculpture Society has awarded this annually, with some exceptions. Below is the list of recipients.

1968        Vincent Glinsky

1969        Frances Lamont

1970        Clark T. Bailey

1971        Adolph Block

1972        Christopher Parks

1973        Joan Bugbee

1974        George Gach

1975        Edward Widstrom

1976        Cleo Hartwig

1977        Marilyn Newmark

1978        John Cavanaugh

1979        Kent Ullberg

1980        Albert Wein

1981        Marc Mellon

1982        Marion Roller

1983        Isidore Margulies

1984        Ruth Nickerson

1985        Harry Marinsky

1986        Jane Armstrong

1987        No prizes awarded

1988        Sidney Simon

1989        Jida Wang

1990        No prizes awarded

1991        Darlis Lamb

1992        Nathaniel Kaz

1993        Harvey Weiss

1994        Joseph Sheppard

1995        Ellen Kennelly

1996        Seiji Saito

1997        Vitaliy Patrov

1998        No prize awarded

1999        Bobbiegita Walker

2000        Chapel

2001        Tim Shinabarger

2002        Betty Branch

2003        Martin Eichinger

2004        Tim Cherry

2005        Joy Beckner

2006        Yuko Ueno

2007        Herb Mignery

2008        Jane DeDecker

2009        Victoria Parsons

2010        David Rogers

2011        Stanley Bleifeld

2012        Rosie Irwin Price

2013        Deon Duncan

2014        Walter Matia

References

20th-century American sculptors
American male sculptors
1881 births
1961 deaths
20th-century American male artists